The Women's 200 metre freestyle competition of the 2016 FINA World Swimming Championships (25 m) was held on 6 December 2016.

Records
Prior to the competition, the existing world and championship records were as follows.

Results

Heats
The heats were held at 10:16.

Final
The final was held at 18:39.

References

Women's 200 metre freestyle